Robert Swarthe (born September 6, 1942) is a special effects artist who started out directing short films. He has two Academy Award nominations.

Academy Award nominations
48th Academy Awards – Nominated in the category of Best Animated short, Kick Me, lost to Great.
52nd Academy Awards – Nominated in the category of Best Visual Effects, Star Trek: The Motion Picture, nomination shared with John Dykstra, Grant McCune, David K. Stewart, Douglas Trumbull and Richard Yuricich. Lost to Alien.

Preservation
The Academy Film Archive preserved Kick Me and The Unicycle Race by Swarthe.

Filmography

As director
 Uncle Walt (1964)
The Unicycle Race (1966)
K-9000: A Space Oddity (1968) with Robert Mitchell 
Kick Me (1975)

As special effects artist
Close Encounters of the Third Kind (1977)
Star Trek: The Motion Picture (1979)
One from the Heart (1982)
The Outsiders (1983)

In addition he appeared in a making of Close Encounters of the Third Kind video in 2001.

See also
Norman Mclaren
Drawn on film

References

External links

Special effects people
Living people
American film directors
1942 births
American animators
American experimental filmmakers